Al-Janudiyah Subdistrict  is a Syrian nahiyah (subdistrict) located in Jisr al-Shughur District in Idlib.  According to the Syria Central Bureau of Statistics (CBS), Al-Janudiyah Subdistrict had a population of 19642 in the 2004 census.

References 

Subdistricts of Idlib Governorate